A regional road in the Republic of Ireland is a class of road not forming a major route (such as a national primary road or national secondary road), but nevertheless forming a link in the national route network. There are over 11,600 kilometres (7,200 miles) of regional roads. Regional roads are numbered with three-digit route numbers, prefixed by "R" (e.g. R105). The equivalent road category in Northern Ireland are B roads.

History
Until 1977, classified roads in the Republic of Ireland were designated with one of two prefixes: "T" for Trunk Roads and "L" for Link Roads. The Local Government (Roads and Motorways) Act  authorised the designation of roads as National roads: in 1977, twenty-five National Primary roads (N1-N25) and thirty-three National Secondary roads (N51-N83) were initially designated under Statutory Instrument S.I. No. 164/1977.

Many of the remaining classified roads became Regional roads (formally authorised under the Roads Act 1993, having been indicated as such on road signs on a non-statutory basis for some years previously) and their routes were designated under a Statutory Instrument ('SI') in 1994. The latest SI designating the routes of Regional roads was published in 2012: the Roads Act 1993 (Classification of Regional Roads) Order 2012.

Other roads formerly classified as Trunk or Link roads eventually became Local roads.

Older signs showing the former Trunk and Link road designations are still to be seen in some locations. The L (for Link Road) prefix on these signs is not connected to the network of Local roads currently in place.

Features
Unlike national roads, regional roads are maintained by local county or city councils rather than the National Roads Authority. The vast majority of the regional road network is made up of single-carriageway roads although some roads are dual-carriageway (see: High-capacity regional roads below). Until the late 1990s, such roads were often in a very poor condition, although increased road maintenance funding to local councils has resulted in more frequent resurfacing of regional roads, as well as relaying and realignment on some routes.

Regional roads are generally subject to a speed limit of 80 km/h (imperial equivalent 50 mph), rather than the 100 km/h (imperial equivalent 62.5 mph) for national roads. Prior to 20 January 2005, when Ireland adopted metric speed limits, national and regional roads had identical speed limits of 60 mph. Regional roads, however, pass through towns, villages and built-up areas frequently, so even lower local speed restrictions are often in place. However, certain regional roads, often sections of former national roads which have been bypassed by motorways or other road improvements, have speed limits of 100 km/h. The R132 (former N1) is an example of a Regional road with a 100 km/h speed limit.

, directional signposting on some regional roads in Ireland remains poor, with even modern signage usually relying on fingerpost signposts located directly at junctions. However, work on improving signposting on regional roads has been continuing since 2003; routes which previously had the most deficient signposting were selected for upgrading first. In 2007, a total of "€7 million to continue progress on the regional roads signposting programme, which commenced in 2003" was granted to local authorities.

High-capacity regional roads
There are some higher-capacity (i.e. not just single-carriageway) sections of regional road, most notably the R113 (Belgard Road) and R445 (Old Naas Road), R132 Swords Inner By-pass and R136 Dublin Outer Ring Road which have sections of dual carriageway.

In some cases, important high-capacity urban routes are built or designated as regional roads, such as the mostly dual-carriageway R710 Waterford Outer Ring Road, or the R774 Greystones to the N11 link, which is dual-carriageway for its full length.

In many other cases, upgraded regional roads (for example, wide two-lane roads) were previously part of a national primary road, prior to the construction of a motorway or other bypass. In most cases, when a national primary road is changed by the creation of a bypass (motorway or other), the road previously forming part of the route is reclassified as a regional road rather than as a local road.

Route definitions

The current routes of all regional roads in Ireland – as defined by Statutory Instrument (S.I.) No 54/2012 (Classification of Regional Roads) Order 2012 under the Roads Act 1993 – are listed below. The S.I. specifies the start and end points of each route and the names of those townlands, villages, towns, and other settlements through which the route passes, as well as individual road names where necessary to establish the exact routing.

R101–R199
 North Circular Road, Dublin
 Blanchardstown – Malahide Road, Dublin
 Finglas – Killester, Dublin
 Finglas – Kilbarrack, Dublin
 Dublin – Howth, County Dublin
 Sutton – Malahide – Swords, County Dublin
 Dublin – Malahide, County Dublin
 Dublin – Naul, County Dublin – Drogheda. County Louth
 Chapelizod – Wolf Tone Quay, Dublin
 St Stephen's Green – Red Cow, Dublin
 Conyngham Road – Beach Road, Sandymount, Dublin
 Chapelizod – Churchtown – Mount Merrion, County Dublin
 Fonthill – Blackrock, County Dublin
 Dublin – Rathfarnham – Brittas, County Dublin
 Rathfarnham, County Dublin – Laragh, County Wicklow
 Ballyboden – Loughlinstown, County Dublin
 Dublin – Enniskerry – Kilcroney, County Wicklow
 Dublin – Blackrock, County Dublin and Dún Laoghaire – Lahaunstown, County Dublin
 Blackrock – Dún Laoghaire, County Dublin – Bray, County Wicklow
 Lucan – Rathcoole – Corbally, County Dublin
 Lucan – Blanchardstown – Skephubble, County Dublin
 Finglas – Balbriggan, County Dublin
 Maynetown – Balgriffin, County Dublin
 Snugborough – Malahide, County Dublin
 Swords, County Dublin – Dunshaughlin, County Meath – Kilcock, County Kildare
 Lissenhall – Portrane, County Dublin
 Blakes Cross – Skerries – Balbriggan, County Dublin
 Lusk – Rush – Skerries, County Dublin
 Coldwinters – Wyanstown, County Dublin
 Coolquoy Common – Grallagh, County Dublin
 Drumcondra Road – East Link Bridge – Merrion Gates, Dublin
 Dublin – Dundalk, County Louth (part of old National Route 1)
 Drummartin Link Road, Sandyford, County Dublin
 Nangor Road, Clondalkin, County Dublin
 Dublin – Ashbourne, County Meath (part of old National Route 2)
 Lucan – Tallaght, County Dublin (Outer Ring Road)
 Dame Street – Tallaght, County Dublin (part of old National Route 81)
 O'Connell Bridge – Mount Merrion Avenue, County Dublin (part of old National Route 11)
 Clonshaugh – Baldoyle, Dublin (part of old National Route 32)
 Dublin – Clonee – Kells – Navan – Derver, County Meath (part of old National Route 3)
 Dublin – Kinnegad, County Westmeath (part of old National Route 4)
 Leixlip, County Kildare – Clonee, County Meath
 Drogheda, County Louth – Bettystown – Julianstown – Kentstown, County Meath
 Bettystown – Mornington, County Meath
 Drogheda, County Louth – Cushinstown, County Meath
 Navan – Balrath, County Meath
 Black Bull – Trim – Athboy, County Meath – Crossdoney, County Cavan
 Piercetown – Primatestown, County Meath
 Dunboyne – Summerhill, County Meath – The Downs, County Westmeath
 Dunboyne, County Meath – Maynooth, County Kildare
 Trim – Summerhill, County Meath – Kilcock, County Kildare
 Innfield – Laracor, County Meath
 Ballynadrumny, County Kildare – Trim, County Meath
 Navan, County Meath – Kinnegad, County Westmeath
 Navan, County Meath – Kingscourt, County Cavan – Monaghan
 Ballinlough Big – Kells – Slane, County Meath
 Ballyboy – Kells – Moynalty, County Meath – Kingscourt, County Cavan
 Blakestown, County Louth – Kingscourt – Knockanoark – Rakenny, County Cavan
 Mell, Louth – Drogheda – Clogherhead – Castlebellingham – Tallanstown, County Louth
 Drogheda – Termonfeckin, County Louth
 Drogheda – Collon, County Louth
 Dunleer – Collon, County Louth
 Ardee – Dunleer – Murrays Cross, County Louth
 Ardee – Louth – Dundalk, County Louth
 Green Gates – Blackrock – Dundalk, County Louth
 Dundalk – Carlingford – County Bridge, County Louth
 Feede – Rockmarshall, County Louth
 The Bush – Greenore, County Louth
 Carlingford – Saint James Well, County Louth
 Dundalk – Drumbilla, County Louth
 Dundalk, County Louth – Carrickmacross, County Monaghan – Bailieborough – Virginia, County Cavan
 Kingscourt, County Cavan – Carrickmacross – Corcullioncrew, County Monaghan
 Carrickmacross – Ballybay, County Monaghan
 Shercock, County Cavan – Castleblayney – Tullynagrow, County Monaghan
 Castleblayney – Lurganearly, County Monaghan
 Castleblayney – Ballybay – Clones, County Monaghan
 Clontibret – Ballybay, County Monaghan
 Cavanreagh – Glasslough – Kiltybeggs, County Monaghan
 Monaghan – Drumfurrer, County Monaghan
 Annaghervy – Inishammon, County Monaghan
 Monaghan – Cootehill, County Cavan – Cavan
 Monaghan – Newbliss – Dyan, County Monaghan
 Ballybay, County Monaghan – Cootehill, County Cavan
 Mullagh – Bailieborough – Cootehill, County Cavan
 Shercock – Cootehill, County Cavan
 Rockcorry – Anny, County Monaghan
 Moynalty, County Meath – Virginia, County Cavan – Longford
 Virginia, County Cavan – Castlepollard, County Westmeath
 New Inn – Ballyjamesduff, County Cavan
 Belturbet – Corrarod, County Cavan
 Cavan – Arvagh, County Cavan – Longford
 Crossdoney, County Cavan – Ballinamore, County Leitrim

R200–R299
 Derrynacreeve, County Cavan – Drumkeeran, County Leitrim
 Belturbet – Killeshandra, County Cavan – Drumsna, County Leitrim
 Dromod, County Leitrim – Derrynacreeve, County Cavan
 Arvagh, County Cavan – Carrigallen, County Leitrim
 Carigallen – Ballinamore, County Leitrim
 Garadice, County Leitrim – Gortawee, County Cavan
 Glangevlin – Blacklion, County Cavan
 Drumshanbo, County Leitrim – Dowra, Mullaghahy, County Cavan
 Drumshanbo – Ballinamore, County Leitrim
 Drumheckil – Fenagh, County Leitrim
 Drumaleague – Drumcong, County Leitrim
 Cappoge – Mooremount, County Louth
 Clones, County Monaghan – Ballyhaise, County Cavan – Cavan
 Tyholland – Castleshane, County Monaghan
 Castleshane – Drumbeo, County Monaghan
 De Valera Road and Port Road, Letterkenny, County Donegal
 Glencolmbkille – Ardara. County Donegal
 Ballyshannon – Ballintra, County Donegal
 Eaghy – Pettigoe, County Donegal
 Pettigoe – Lough Derg, County Donegal
 Pettigoe – Letter Bridge, County Donegal
 Castlefinn – Alt Upper, County Donegal
 Stranorlar – Dunmore, County Donegal
 Newtowncunningham – Athaghaderry, County Donegal
 Ring of Inishowen, County Donegal
 Muff – Burnfoot – Carrownamaddy, County Donegal
 Quigleys Point – Carndonagh, County Donegal
 Moville – Portsallagh, County Donegal
 Doon Bridge – Malin – Slievebane, County Donegal
 Malin – Templemoyle Cross, County Donegal
 Drumfree – Gleneely, County Donegal
 Letterkenny – Rathmelton – Creeslough, County Donegal
 Kilmacrennan – Millford – Portsalon, County Donegal
 Rathmelton – Carrowkeel – Cionn Fhanáda, County Donegal
 Carrigart – Na Dúnaibh, County Donegal
 Kilmacrenan – Rathmelton, County Donegal
 Letterkenny – Glenties, County Donegal
 Doon Glebe – Gaoth Dobhair, County Donegal
 Ballybofey – An Clochán Liath, County Donegal
 Ballybofey – Glenties, County Donegal
 Carrickyscanlan – An Dúchoraidh, County Donegal
 An Tearmann – Drumfin, County Donegal
 Glenveagh – An Fál Carrach, County Donegal
 Gort an Choirce – Doirí Beaga – Croithlí, County Donegal
 Acomhal Ghaoth Dobhair – Cé an Bhuna Bhig, County Donegal
 Croithlí – Ailt an Choráin – An Clochán Liath, County Donegal
 Ailt an Choráin – Cé Ailt an Choráin, County Donegal
 Maas – Ardara, County Donegal
 Glenties – Mountcharles, County Donegal
 Aghayeevoge – Killybegs – Málainn Bhig, County Donegal
 Raphoe – Lifford, County Donegal
 Rossgeir – Saint Johnstown – Newtowncunningham, County Donegal
 Mín Doire Abhainn – Aerfort na Carraige Finne, County Donegal
 The Diamond, Donegal and Ballyshannon – Bundoran, County Donegal (part of old National Route 15)
 Portsalon Coast Road, County Donegal
 Sligo Airport Road, Strandhill, County Donegal
 Sligo – Cornalaghta, County Leitrim
 Cliffoney – Mullaghmore, County Sligo
 Bundoran, County Donegal Manorhamilton – Carrick-on-Shannon, County Leitrim
 Kinlough – Conray – Glenfarne, County Leitrim
 Manorhamilton – Dooard, County Leitrim
 Manorhamilton – Kiltyclogher, County Leitrim
 Carrowroe, County Sligo – Leitrim
 Ardcarn – Keadew – Mountallen, County Roscommon
 Sligo – Pollboy, County Leitrim
 Sligo – Killarga, County Leitrim
 Dromahair – Sriff, County Leitrim
 Dromahair – Corderry, County Leitrim
 Gortlownan – Ballisadare, County Sligo
 Sligo – Rosses Point, County Sligo
 Sligo – Strandhill – Ballisadare, County Sligo
 Ballynaboll, County Sligo – Ballaghaderreen, County Roscommon – Ballyhaunis, County Mayo
 Boyle, County Roscommon – Tobercurry, County Sligo – Ballina, County Mayo
 Ballymote, County Sligo – Boyle, County Roscommon
 Ballymote – Quarryfield, County Sligo
 Dromore West, County Sligo – Dooyeaghvy, County Mayo
 Inishcrone – Carrownurlar, County Sligo
 Drumsna – Drumheckil, County Leitrim

R300–R399
 Partry, County Mayo – An Fhairche, County Galway
 Castlebar – Rahans, County Mayo
 Castlebar – Newport, County Mayo
 Castlebar – Bellacorick, County Mayo
 Bangor – An Fod Dubh, County Mayo
 Béal an Mhuirthead – Ballycastle – Ballina, County Mayo
 Pontoon – Crossmolina – Ballycastle, County Mayo
 Bogadoon – Crossmolina, County Mayo
 Newport – Boggy, County Mayo
 Foxford – Pontoon, County Mayo
 Mallaranny – Keem, County Mayo
 Swinford – Claremorris, County Mayo
 Ballylahan – Bohola – Kiltimagh, County Mayo
 Kiltimagh – Kilkelly, County Mayo
 Kiltimagh – Knock – Ballyhaunis, County Mayo
 Balla – Kiltimagh, County Mayo
 Glentavraun, County Mayo – Cloonarragh, County Roscommon
 Loughglinn – Meelick, County Roscommon
 Cuilmore, County Mayo – Pollremon, County Galway
 Ballindine, County Mayo – Moylough, County Galway
 Knock, County Mayo (part of old National Route 17)
 Westport – Partry, County Mayo
 Claremorris – Ballinrobe, County Mayo
 Moylough – Tuam, County Galway – Kilmaine, County Mayo
 Tuam – Headford, County Galway
 Ballinrobe – Neale, County Mayo – Headford, County Galway
 Westport – Louisburgh – Leenane, County Mayo
 Leenaun – An Teach Dóite – An Spidéal, County Galway – Galway
 Taylors Hill, Galway
 Salthill – Newcastle – Oranmore, County Galway
 Galway – Caltra, County Galway
 Scrib – Sraith Salach, County Galway
 Ballinafad – Roundstone – Clifden, County Galway
 Lettershinna – Doire Fhada Thiar, County Galway
 Casla – An Cheathrú Rua, County Galway
 Sraith Salach – Kylemore, County Galway
 An Mám, County Galway – Neale, County Mayo
 Cong – Cross, County Mayo
 Kinvarra – Craughwell – Tuam, County Galway
 Derrydonnell – Athenry – Ballinasloe, County Galway
 Loughrea – Tallyho Cross, County Galway
 Loughrea – Bellafa, County Galway
 Loughrea – Woodford, County Galway
 Portumna, County Galway – Ennis, County Clare
 Portumna – Ballinasloe, County Galway
 Portumna – Ballinasloe, County Galway
 Killimor, County Galway – Cloghan, County Offaly
 Athleague, County Roscommon – Ballinasloe, County Galway – Blue Ball, County Offaly
 Ballinasloe – Mount Bellew Bridge, County Galway
 Mount Bellew Bridge – New Inn, County Galway
 Dunmore – Ballymoe, County Galway
 Williamstown, County Galway – Castlerea, County Roscommon – Boyle, County Roscommon
 Dunmore, County Galway – Athleague, County Roscommon – Athlone, County Westmeath
 Newsbridge, County Galway – Bellanamullia, County Roscommon
 Moylough – Ballymoe, County Galway
 Marlay – Ballynahowna, County Galway
 Roscommon – Aghagower, County Roscommon
 Ballymoe, County Galway – Tulsk, County Roscommon
 Four Mile House – Strokestown, County Roscommon – Carrick-on-Shannon, County Leitrim
 Elphin – Gortnagoyne, County Roscommon
 Frenchpark, County Roscommon – Carrick-on-Shannon, County Leitrim
 Roosky, County Leitrim – Ballyleague, County Roscommon
 Na Doiriú Theas – Cé Nua Ros an Mhíl, County Galway
 Breaffy – Castlebar, County Mayo
 Casla – Leitir Mealláin, County Galway
 Swinford – Kilkelly, County Mayo
 Lurga Upper – Ireland West Airport Knock
 Castleplunket – Castlerea, County Roscommon
 Louisburgh – Roonagh Pier, County Mayo
 Streamstown – Cleggan, County Galway
 Kilbeggan – Skeagh, County Westmeath
 Mullingar – Ballymore – Athlone, County Westmeath
 Mullingar – Horseleap, County Westmeath – Clara, County Offaly
 Mullingar, County Westmeath – Ballymahon – Lanesborough, County Longford
 Mullingar – Ballinacarrigy, County Westmeath – Longford
 Tullanisky, County Westmeath – Kilcogy, County Cavan
 Delvin – Castlepollard, County Westmeath – Edgeworthstown, County Longford
 Coole, County Westmeath – Granard, County Longford
 Longford – Ballymahon, County Longford
 Derraghan More – Brickeens, County Longford
 Kilcurry – Ratharney, County Longford

R400–R499
 Mullingar, County Westmeath – Cushina, County Offaly
 Kinnegad, County Westmeath – Edenderry, County Offaly – Kildare
 Innfield, County Meath – Ballina Cross, County Offaly
 Lucan, County Dublin – Clane – Carbury, County Kildare
 Leixlip – Saint Wolstans, County Kildare
 Maynooth, County Kildare – Newcastle, County Dublin
 Maynooth – Barberstown Cross, County Kildare
 Kilcock – Naas, County Kildare
 Maynooth – Prosperous, County Kildare
 Blackwood Cross – Naas, County Kildare
 Naas, County Kildare – Blessington, County Wicklow
 Naas, County Kildare – Hollywood, County Wicklow
 Stephenstown South, County Kildare – Whitestown, County Wicklow
 Kildare – Kilcullen – Ballymore Eustace, County Kildare
 Shee Bridge – Monasterevin, County Kildare
 Allenwood Cross – Kildare – Crookstown Upper, County Kildare
 Milltown – Droichead Nua – Kinnegad Cross, County Kildare
 Monasterevin, County Kildare – Carlow
 Athy – Castledermot, County Kildare – Tullow, County Carlow
 Greatheath – Portarlington, County Laois – Bracknagh, County Offaly – Rathangan, County Kildare
 Killinure, County Laois – Bawnoges, County Westmeath
 Tullamore, County Offaly – Roscrea, County Tipperary
 Cappakeel – New Inn – Mountmellick – Coolagh Cross, County Laois
 Portarlington, County Offaly – Mountmellick – Mountrath, County Laois
 Lea Cross, County Laois – Monasterevin, County Kildare
 Rathbrennan – Abbeyleix, County Laois
 Portlaoise – Castlecomer, County Kilkenny
 Cashel – Stradbally, County Laois – Cloney, County Kildare
 Stradbally, County Laois – Athy, County Kildare
 Ballickmoyler, County Laois – Maganey Cross, County Kildare
 Carlow – Mountrath, County Laois
 Crettyard – Molloys Cross, County Laois
 Abbeyleix, County Laois – Ballyragget, County Kilkenny
 Abbeyleix, County Laois – Templemore, County Tipperary
 Borris-in-Ossory – Durrow, County Laois
 Borris-in-Ossory – Rathdowney, County Laois – Balief Cross, County Kilkenny
 Kilbeggan, County Westmeath – Ferbane, County Offaly
 Ferbane – Kilcormac, County Offaly
 Borrisokane, County Tipperary – Cloghan, County Offaly
 Birr – Banagher, County Offaly
 Birr – Kinnity, County Offaly – Mountrath, County Laois
 Rhode – Edenderry, County Offaly
 Clonbullogue – Bracknagh, County Offaly
 Ring Road, Tullamore, County Offaly
 Shannonbridge – Clonmacnoise, County Offaly – Farnagh, County Westmeath
 Naas, County Kildare – Portlaoise, County Laois – Roscrea – Nenagh, County Tipperary – Limerick – Crathloemoyle, County Clare (part of old National Routes 7 and 18)
 Kinnegad, County Westmeath – Galway (old National Route 6)
 Naas, County Kildare – Waterford (old National Route 9)
 Collinstown – Celbridge, County Kildare
 Gort, County Galway – Smithstown, County Clare (part of old National Route 18)
 Doolin – Doolin Pier, County Clare
 Gort, County Galway – Corofin – Milltown Malbay, County Clare
 Gort, County Galway – Scarriff, County Clare
 Gort, County Galway – Cratloe, County Clare
 Limerick – Killaloe – Scarriff, County Clare
 Limerick – Parteen, County Clare
 Parkroe – Bodyke, County Clare
 Cloughan – Broadford, County Clare – Birdhill, County Tipperary
 Clogher – Rosneillan, County Clare
 Ballynahinch – Feakle, County Clare
 Kilmurry – Ennis, County Clare
 Newmarket-on-Fergus – Sixmilebridge, County Clare
 Shannon Town – Cloonlara, County Clare
 Newmarket-on-Fergus – Shannon, County Clare
 Ennis – Killadysert – Kilrush Pier, County Clare
 Ennis – Milltown Malbay, County Clare
 College Green, Ennis, County Clare
 Ennis – Lisdoonvarna, County Clare
 Ballvaughan – Black Head – Lisdoonvarna, County Clare
 Lisdoonvarna – Cliffs of Moher – Lehinch, County Clare
 Ballynalackan – Coogyulla, County Clare
 Ballyvaughan – Leamaneh Cross, County Clare
 Kilfenora – Ennistimon, County Clare
 Spanish Point Road, County Clare
 Cloonadrum – Kilrush, County Clare
 Doonbegh – Creegh – Knockalough, County Clare
 Derrycrossaun Cross – Corrowniska, County Clare
 Carrowbane – Killimer Ferry, County Clare
 Kilkee – Loop Head, County Clare
 Breaghva – Carrigaholt, County Clare
 Portumna, County Galway – Birr, County Offaly
 Borrisokane, County Tipperary – Moneygall, County Offaly
 Nenagh – Cloughjordan, County Tipperary – Shinrone, County Offaly – Roscrea, County Tipperary
 Sharavogue – Shinrone, County Offaly
 Nenagh – Coolbaun – Carrigahorrig, County Tipperary
 Nenagh – Ballina – Birdhill, County Tipperary
 Nenagh – Dromineer, County Tipperary
 Kilmastulla, County Tipperary – Killaloe, County Clare
 Nenagh – Dolla – Tipperary, County Tipperary
 Nenagh – Thurles, County Tipperary
 Toomyvara – Dolla – Boher, County Tipperary

R500–R599
 Nenagh – Silvermines, County Tipperary
 Templemore – Borrisoleigh, County Tipperary
 Templemore, County Tipperary – Johnstown, County Kilkenny
 Limerick – Milestone – Thurles, County Tipperary
 Birdhill – Newport, County Tipperary
 Grange East, County Limerick – Dundrum – Cashel, County Tipperary
 Annacotty – Cappamore, County Limerick
 Cluggin Cross – Doon, County Limerick
 Childers Road, Limerick
 Dock Road – Ballycummin, Limerick
 Limerick – Crean, County Limerick
 Limerick – Kilmallock, County Limerick – Fermoy, County Cork
 Bearys Cross, County Limerick – Mitchelstown, County Cork
 Rockstown – Herbertstown, County Limerick
 Tipperary – Charleville, County Cork – Abbeyfeale, County Limerick
 Emly, County Tipperary – Bruff – Croom, County Limerick
 Kilmallock, County Limerick – Mitchelstown, County Cork
 Kilmallock – Rathkeale – Askeaton, County Limerick (part of old National Route 69)
 Adare – Drumcolliher, County Limerick
 Ballynaskig – Ballykevan – Newcastle West, County Limerick
 Newcastle West – Foynes, County Limerick
 Newcastle West, County Limerick – Kildorrery, County Cork
 Rathkeale, County Limerick – Listowel, County Kerry (part of old National Route 21)
 Glin – Athea – Abbeyfeale, County Limerick
 Dalys Cross – Montpelier, County Limerick
 Patrickswell, County Limerick – Limerick (part of old National Route 20)
 Caherdavin – Ballysimon Road, Limerick (part of old National Routes 18 and 24)
 Doirín Dún Aodha – Guagán Barra, County Cork
 An Mhuiríoch – Feothanach – Dingle, County Kerry
 Crosaire na Coille Móire – Srón Bhroin, County Kerry
 Tarbert – Ballybunion – Tralee, County Kerry
 Ballylongford – Listowel, County Kerry
 Listowel – Ballybunion, County Kerry
 Ballyconry – Lisselton, County Kerry
 Listowel, County Kerry – Abbeyfeale, County Limerick
 Ballyduff – Tralee, County Kerry
 Abbeydorney – Listowel, County Kerry
 Tralee – Fenit, County Kerry
 Dingle – Ceann Sléibhe – Baile an Fheirtéaraigh, County Kerry
 Camp – An Conair, Dingle, County Kerry
 Farranfore – Castlemaine – Anascaul, County Kerry
 Milltown – Fossa, County Kerry
 Glenbeigh – Rossbeigh, County Kerry
 Caherciveen – Portmagee – Knightstown, County Kerry
 Kilcoman – Baile an Sceilg – Portmagee, County Kerry
 Kineigh Cross – Emlaghmore, County Kerry
 Sneem – Molls Gap, County Kerry
 Kenmare – Poulgorm, County Kerry
 Glenflesk – Barraduff, County Kerry
 Kenmare, County Kerry – Castletownbere, County Cork
 Glengarriff – Dursey Sound, County Cork
 Tuosist – Lauragh, County Kerry
 Derreen, County Kerry – Healy Pass – Adrigole, County Cork
 Barnes Gap – Eyeries, County Cork
 Wellesley Bridge, County Kerry – Kippagh Junction, County Cork
 Castleisland, County Kerry – Clonbannin, County Cork
 Ballydesmond – Newmarket – Charleville, County Cork
 Broadford, County Limerick – Kanturk, County Cork – Cork
 Kanturk – Buttevant, County Cork
 Twopothouse – Doneraile, County Cork
 Ballydesmond, County Cork – Rathmore, County Kerry – Macroom, County Cork
 Millstreet – Sandpit Cross, County Cork
 Macroom – Ballylickey, County Cork
 Crookstown – Kealkill, County Cork
 Bandon – Bantry, County Cork
 Macroom – Dunmanway, County Cork
 Capeen – Clonakilty, County Cork
 Bandon – Ballyheedy, County Cork
 Crookstown – Bandon, County Cork
 Bantry – Crookhaven, County Cork
 Ballydehob – Toormore, County Cork
 Skibereen – Drimoleague, County Cork
 Aghaville – Derreeny, County Cork
 Skibbereen – Baltimore, County Cork
 Skibbereen – Castletownshend, County Cork
 Leap – Glandore – Rosscarbery, County Cork
 Burgatia Cross – Owenahincha – Tulligee, County Cork
 Dunmanway – Clonakilty, County Cork

R600–R699
 Cork Airport – Kinsale – Clonakilty, County Cork
 Timoleague – Courtmacsherry, County Cork
 Bandon – Timoleague, County Cork
 Bandon – Garranereagh, County Cork
 Ballinspittle – Old Head of Kinsale – Barrell Cross, County Cork
 Innishannon – Kinsale, County Cork
 Ballythomas Cross – Archdeacon Duggan Bridge, County Cork
 Halfway – Kinsale, County Cork
 Cork – Ballincollig, County Cork
 Cork – Carrigaline (N28)
 Cork – Passage West – Raffeen, County Cork
 Shannonpark – Belgooly, County Cork
 Carrigaline – Crosshaven, County Cork
 Ringaskiddy – Ballinhassig, County Cork
 Cork – Rathcormack, County Cork
 Cork – Riverstown, County Cork
 White's Cross – Annacarton Bridge, County Cork
 Blarney – Cloghroe, County Cork
 Cork – Coachford – Macroom, County Cork
 Farnanes – Mallow, County Cork
 Dromahane – Mallow, County Cork
 Gortnagross – Newberry Cross, County Cork
 Cloghroe – Cannon's Cross, County Cork
 Little Island Loop Road, County Cork
 Tullagreen – Cobh, County Cork
 Midleton – Rathcormack, County Cork
 Midleton, County Cork – Tallow, County Waterford
 Rathcormack, County Cork – Tallow, County Waterford
 Midleton – Ballycotton, County Cork
 Ballynacorra – Whitegate, County Cork
 Cloyne – Rostellan, County Cork
 Castlemartyr – Shangarry, County Cork
 Kelly – Ladysbridge, County Cork
 Youghal, County Cork – Tallow Bridge, County Waterford
 Northern Ring Road, Cork
 Manch West – Drinagh – Skibbereen, County Cork
 Robb's Bridge – Clyda Bridge Lower, Mallow, County Cork
 Durrow, County Laois – Cashel – Caher, County Tipperary – Mitchelstown – Fermoy – Dunkettle, County Cork (part of old National Route 8)
 Knockagh – Caher. County Tipperary
 Victoria Cross – Doocloyne, Cork
 Thurles – Suir Bridge, County Tipperary
 Thurles – Holycross – Cashel, County Tipperary
 Holycross – Tipperary, County Tipperary
 Tipperary – Ballyfauskeen Cross, County Limerick
 Bansha, County Tipperary – Galbally – Newtown, County Limerick
 Tipperary – Newtown, County Limerick
 Mitchelstown, County Cork – Clonmel, County Tipperary
 Fermoy, County Cork – Lismore, County Waterford
 Molly Barrys Cross – Ballyderown Cross, County Cork
 Caher – Clogheen, County Tipperary – Lismore, County Waterford
 Glentanagree Bridge – Cappoquin, County Waterford
 Caher – Ardfinnan, County Tipperary
 Clonmel, County Tipperary – Kilcloher – Piltown Cross, County Waterford
 Knockaraha Bridge – Ballymacmague – Dungarvan, County Waterford
 Kielys Cross – Ardmore – Clearys Cross, County Waterford
 Killongford – Ceann Heilbhic, County Waterford
 Dungarvan – Tramore – Waterford, County Waterford
 Lemybrien, County Waterford – Carrick-on-Suir, County Tipperary
 Carrick-on-Suir, County Tipperary – Seafield, County Waterford
 Clonmel, County Tipperary – Lowrys Bridge, County Waterford
 Kilmacthomas, County Waterford
 Clonmel Carrick-on-Suir, County Tipperary – Ballyduff, County Waterford – Waterford
 The Sweep – Knockmahon, County Waterford
 Bawnfune – Tramore, County Waterford
 Waterford – Passage East, County Waterford
 Blenheim Cross, Waterford – Dunmore East, County Waterford
 Kilmacomb – Tramore, County Waterford
 Morissons Road, Waterford
 New Inn – Clonmel, County Tipperary
 Cashel – Clonmel, County Tipperary
 Urlingford, County Kilkenny – Clonmel, County Tipperary
 Tranagh – Ninemilehouse, County Tipperary
 Cashel – Killenaule, County Tipperary – Ballymack, County Kilkenny
 Cashel – Fethard, County Tipperary – Mullinahone – Callan, County Kilkenny
 Urlingford, County Kilkenny – Kilkenny
 Freshford – Ballyragget – Castlecomer, County Kilkenny
 Kilkenny – Kilmanagh – Callan, County Kilkenny
 Carrick-on-Suir – Glenbower, County Kilkenny
 Carrick-on-Suir, County Tipperary – Kilkenny
 Callan – Baunreagh – Pilltown, County Kilkenny – Mountbelton, County Waterford
 Callan – Knocktopher, County Kilkenny

R700–R774
 Kilkenny – Thomastown, County Kilkenny – New Ross, County Wexford
 Kilmaganny – Sheepstown, County Kilkenny
 Coolgrange – Gowran, County Kilkenny – Enniscorthy, County Wexford
 Thomastown, County Kilkenny – Ballymurphy County Carlow
 Mullinavat, County Kilkenny – New Ross, County Wexford
 Leighlinbridge – Borris, County Carlow – Stripes, County Kilkenny
 Fethard – Kilsheelan, County Tipperary
 Ballingarrane – Moangarriff – Clonmel, County Tipperary
 Waterford – Waterford Airport – Kilmacleague, County Waterford
 Inner Ring Road, Waterford
 Outer Ring Road, Waterford
 Waterford – Slieveroe, County Kilkenny
 Kilkenny – Paulstown, County Kilkenny (part of old National Route 10)
 Danesfort – Ballyhale, County Kilkenny (part of old National Route 10)
 Royaloak – Bagenalstown – Kildavin, County Carlow
 Carlow – Tullow, County Carlow – Gorey, County Wexford
 Rathvilly – Carlow, County Carlow
 Straboe – Hacketstown, County Carlow
 Borris, County Carlow – New Ross, County Wexford
 Kiltealy, County Wexford – Wexford
 Ballynabanoge – Ballinlug East, County Wexford
 Coolnaveagh – Raheenagurren East, County Wexford
 New Ross – Arthurstown – Wellingtonbridge, County Wexford – Wexford
 Slaght – Hook Head, County Wexford
 Dunmain – Ballymackesy, County Wexford
 Ballynabola – Wellingtonbridge – Rosslare, County Wexford
 Haggard – Duncannon, County Wexford
 Ballyhit – Waddingtown – Baldwinstown, County Wexford
 Ballykilliane – Kilmore Quay, County Wexford
 Ballybrennan Big – Rosslare, County Wexford
 Wexford – Castlebridge – Gorey, County Wexford
 Faheys Cross – Courtown – Gorey, County Wexford
 Curracloe – White Gap, County Wexford
 Enniscorthy – Blackwater, County Wexford
 Wheelagower – Ferns, County Wexford
 Wheelagower – Bunclody, County Wexford – Croneyhorn, County Wicklow
 Mullmast, County Kildare – Hacketstown, County Carlow – Arklow, County Wicklow
 Carnew – Tinahely, County Wicklow
 Shillelagh – Tinahely, County Wicklow
 Arklow – Wicklow – Rathnew, County Wicklow
 Wicklow – The Beehive, County Wicklow
 Rathnew – Woodenbridge, County Wicklow
 Aughrim – Ballinacarrig, County Wicklow
 Avoca – Ballinacor, County Wicklow
 Rathdrum – Laragh – Kilmacanogue, County Wicklow
 Laragh – Wicklow Gap – Dunlavin, County Wicklow
 Laragh – Glendalough, County Wicklow
 Lockstown – Burgage Moyle, County Wicklow
 Tinode – Sally Gap – Draghmore, County Wicklow
 Enniskerry – Killough, County Wicklow
 Rathnew – Kilcoole – Bray, County Wicklow
 Greystones – Glen of the Downs, County Wicklow
 Ashford – Annamoe, County Wicklow
 Ashford – Roundwood, County Wicklow
 Newtownmountkennedy – Roundwood, County Wicklow
 The Strand, Bray, County Wicklow
 Bray – Hollybrook, County Wicklow
 Southern Ring Road, Bray, County Wicklow
 Ballindinas, County Wexford – Wexford
 Arthurstown – Ballyhack, County Wexford
 Newtownmountkennedy – Ashford – Rathnew – Arklow, County Wicklow – Gorey, County Wexford (part of old National Route 11)
 Jack White's Cross – Brittas, County Wicklow
 Willow Grove – Charlesland, County Wicklow

R801–R899
 North Wall, Dublin
 Dorset Street – Bath Road, Dublin
 Summerhill – Parnell Street, Dublin
 Granvy Row – Cork Street, Dublin
 Ellis Quay – Finglas, Dublin
 Blanchardstown – Manor Street, Dublin
 Clontarf Road, Dublin
 Artane – Clontarf, Dublin
 Raheny – Baldoyle, County Dublin
 Cornmarket – Inchicore, Dublin
 South Circular Road, Dublin
 Davitt Road, Dublin
 City Quay, Dublin
 Lombard Street East, Dublin
 Westland Row – Donnybrook, Dublin
 Baggot Street, Dublin
 Harolds Cross – Ballyboden, County Dublin
 Terenure – Walkinstown Roundabout, County Dublin
 Long Mile Road – Tallaght Village, County Dublin
 Rathmines – Milltown, Dublin
 Rathfarnham – Churchtown, Dublin
 Grange Road, Rathfarnham, County Dublin
 Ailesbury Road, Dublin
 Milltown – Blackrock, County Dublin
 Wyckham Way, Dundrum, County Dublin
 Blackrock – Cornelscourt, County Dublin
 Stradbrook Road, Killiney, County Dublin
 Monkstown – Dalkey, County Dublin
 Foxrock – Dún Laoghaire, County Dublin
 Sandycove Seafront, County Dublin
 Ballyfermot Road, Dublin
 Embankment Road, Clontarf, Dublin
 Woodville – Cooldrinagh, County Dublin
 Loughlinstown – Shankill, County Dublin
 Walkinstown Embankment Road, County Dublin
 Inchicore – Kilmainham, Dublin
 Earlsfort Terrace, Dublin
 Golden Ball – Cornellscourt, County Dublin
 Snugborough Road, Blanchardstown, County Dublin
 Sundays Well Road, Cork
 Christy Ring Bridge – Washington Street, Cork
 Grand Parade, Cork
 Glasheen Road and Bishopstown Road, Cork
 South Douglas Road and Grange Road, Cork
 Boreenmanagh Road and Skehard Road, Cork
 Well Road and Blackroad Road, Cork
 Saint Patricks Quay, Cork
 Carr's Hill, Douglas, County Cork
 Ennis Road, Limerick
 Lord Edward Street and New Road, Limerick
 Mungret – Quinns Cross, Limerick
 Saint Johns Street, Waterford
 Grannagh – Newrath, County Kilkenny
 Eglinton Street and University Road, Galway
 Salthill Road and Newcastle Road, Galway
 Ballypaan Road, Galway
 Headford Road, Galway
 Church Square, Monaghan
 Fermanagh Street, Clones, County Monaghan
 Pearse Road and Markievicz Road, Sligo
 Clon Road and Gort Road, Ennis, County Clare
 Mitchell Street, Nenagh, County Tipperary
 North Circular Road, Tralee, County Kerry
 Castle Street, Tralee, County Kerry
 Park Road and High Street, Killarney, County Kerry
 Port Road, Killarney, County Kerry
 Oakpark Road Tralee County Kerry replacing portion of N69 in Tralee
 Facksbridge – Miles, Clonakilty, County Cork
 Main Street, Mallow, County Cork
 Irishtown, Clonmel, County Tipperary
 Main Street, Carrick-on-Suir, County Tipperary
 New Road, Kilkenny
 Wolfe Tone Street and John Street, Kilkenny
 Dublin Road, Carlow
 John Street, Wexford
 Blackstoops – Saint Johns Road, Enniscorthy, County Wexford
 Market Square – Chapel Street, Athenry, County Galway
 Cannon Row, Navan, County Meath
 Ludlow Street, Navan, County Meath
 Castle Street, Trim, County Meath
 Greenhills Road, Drogheda, County Louth

R900–R941
 West Street, Drogheda, County Louth
 Main Street, Cavan
 Bridge Street, Boyle, County Roscommon
 Main Street, Carrick-on-Shannon, County Leitrim
 Dunloe Street, Ballinasloe, County Galway
 Link Road, Tipperary, County Tipperary
 Main Street, Midleton, County Cork
 The Front Strand, Youghal, County Cork
 College Road, Kilkenny
 Waterford Road, Kilkenny
 Clogherane – Abbeyside, Dungarvan, County Waterford
 Jordanstown – Paulstown, County Kilkenny
 Mitchelstown Road – The Square, Caher, County Tipperary
 Roscommon Road, Athlone, County Westmeath
 Ballymahon Road, Athlone, County Westmeath
 Waterhouse Road, Athlone, County Westmeath
 Spencer Street, Castlebar, County Mayo
 Little Bray – Fassaroe, Bray, County Wicklow
 Killerisk Road, Tralee, County Kerry
 Cloghore – Belleek Bridge, County Donegal
 Merlin Park – Droughiska, Galway
 Abbeyleix Road, Portlaoise, County Laois
 Bishop Street, Tuam, County Galway
 Church Street, Carlow, County Carlow
 Killybegs Road, Donegal, County Donegal
 Dooradoyle, County Limerick
 Main Street, Carrickmacross, County Monaghan
 Pearse Street, Ballina, County Mayo
 Main Street, Ballyhaunis, County Mayo
 Shortcastle Street, Mallow, County Cork
 Bridge Street, Skibbereen, County Cork
 Golden Road, Cashel, County Tipperary
 Castle Street and Haggard Street, Trim, County Meath
 Castletown Road, Dundalk, County Louth
 Bellananagh Road, Cavan
 Allingham Road, Ballyshannon, County Donegal
 Dublin Road, Monaghan
 Dublin Road, Castleblaney, County Monaghan
 Ramelton Road, Letterkenny, County Donegal
 Kells, County Meath
 Tuam, County Galway (old N17)

See also
History of roads in Ireland
List of Ireland-related topics
Local roads in Ireland
Motorways in the Republic of Ireland
National primary road
National Roads Authority
National secondary road
Roads in Ireland
Road signs in Ireland
Road speed limits in the Republic of Ireland
Transport in Ireland
Trunk roads in Ireland

References

Sources
Local Government (Roads and Motorways) Act, 1974
S.I. No. 164/1977 – Local Government (Roads and Motorways) Act, 1974 (Declaration of National Roads) Order, 1977
Roads Act, 1993
S.I. No. 400/1994: Roads Act, 1993 (Declaration of Regional Roads) Order, 1994
Roads Act 1993 (Classification of Regional Roads) Order 2006 – Department of Transport

 
Types of roads